Advanced Placement (AP) United States Government and Politics (often shortened to AP Gov and sometimes referred to as AP American Government or simply AP Government) is a college-level course and examination offered to high school students through the College Board's Advanced Placement Program. This course surveys the structure and function of American government and politics that begins with an analysis of the United States Constitution, the foundation of the American political system. Students study the three branches of government, administrative agencies that support each branch, the role of political behavior in the democratic process, rules governing elections, political culture, and the workings of political parties and interest groups.

Topic outline 
The material in the course is composed of multiple subjects from the Constitutional roots of the United States to recent developments in civil rights and liberties. The AP United States Government examination covers roughly six subjects listed below in approximate percentage composition of the examination.

Foundations of American Democracy (15-22%) 

 Considerations that influenced the formulation and adoption of the Constitution
 Separation of powers
 Federalism
 Theories of democratic government

Interactions Among Branches of Government (25-36%) 

 The major formal and informal institutional arrangements of power; the Congress, the Presidency, the Bureaucracy, and the Federal Courts

Civil Liberties and Civil Rights (13-18%) 

 The development of civil liberties and civil rights by judicial interpretation
 Knowledge of substantive rights and liberties
 The impact of the Fourteenth Amendment on the constitutional development of rights and liberties

American Political Ideologies and Beliefs (10–15%) 

 Beliefs that citizens hold about their government and its leaders

 Processes by which citizens learn about politics
 The nature, sources, and consequences of public opinion
 The ways in which citizens vote and otherwise participate in political life
 Factors that influence citizens to differ from one another in terms of political beliefs and behaviors

Political Participation (20-27%) 

 Political parties and elections
 Functions
 Organization
 Development
 Effects on the political process
 Electoral laws and systems
 Interest groups, including political action committees (PACs)
 The range of interests represented
 The activities of interest groups
 The effects of interest groups on the political process
 The unique characteristics and roles of PACs in the political process
 The mass media
 The functions and structures of the media
 The impact of media on politics

Public Policy (Part of the Units, embedded within all 5 units) 

Public policy making in a federal system
 The formation of policy agendas
 The role of institutions in the enactment of policy
 The role of the bureaucracy and the courts in policy implementation and interpretation
 Linkages between policy processes and the following:
Political institutions and federalism
Political parties
Interest groups
Public opinion
Elections
 Policy networks

Required Supreme Court cases and Foundation Documents

Supreme Court cases
Starting from 2019 Administration of the Test, the College Board requires students to know 15 Supreme Court cases. After the Supreme Court's decision in Dobbs v. Jackson Women's Health Organization, Roe v. Wade was removed from the required case list. The 14 required Supreme Court cases are listed below:

Foundation Documents
Same as Supreme Court Cases, the College Board requires students to know 9 Foundation Documents. The 9 Documents are listed below:

Exam
The Multiple-Choice section is analytical and the Free-Response questions are fairly consistent.

 Section I: Multiple-Choice (80 minutes, 55 questions, 50% of Total Exam Scores)
 Section II: Free-response (100 minutes, 4 questions, 50% of Total Exam Scores)

Grade distribution
The grade distributions since 2007 were:

References

External links
AP United States Government and Politics at CollegeBoard.com

Political science education
Advanced Placement
Politics of the United States